The Tambre is a coastal river that crosses Galicia, in northwestern Spain.

The river flows through the province of A Coruña; the municipalities along its course are Sobrado, Curtis, Vilasantar, Boimorto, Mesía, Frades, Arzúa, O Pino, Oroso, Ordes, Trazo, Tordoia, Santiago de Compostela, Val do Dubra, Ames, A Baña, Brion, Negreira, Outes, Mazaricos, Noia and Lousame. Its mouth forms the Ría de Muros e Noia estuary.

It has been designated a Site of Community Importance.

In ancient times it was called Támaris, its name being related to that of the River Tamar in Cornwall. It was from the lands north of this river that the Spanish County of Trastámara and the royal House of Trastámara derive their name (Tras-Támara meaning "across the Tambre"). Tamarix may derived its name from the river.

Gallery

See also 
 List of rivers of Spain
 Rivers of Galicia

References

Rivers of Spain
Rivers of Galicia (Spain)